William George Brandt (March 21, 1915 – May 16, 1968) was a professional baseball player.  He was a right-handed pitcher over parts of three seasons (1941–43) with the Pittsburgh Pirates.  For his career, he compiled a 5–3 record, with a 3.57 earned run average, and 21 strikeouts in 80 innings pitched.

From 1944 to 1945, Brandt served in the United States Navy during World War II. While in the Navy, he played for the Great Lakes Naval Training Station Bluejackets in 1944.

References

External links

1915 births
1968 deaths
American military sports players
Pittsburgh Pirates players
Major League Baseball pitchers
Baseball players from Indiana
Hutchinson Larks players
Hutchinson Pirates players
Gadsden Pilots players
Harrisburg Senators players
Toronto Maple Leafs (International League) players
Columbus Red Birds players
Hollywood Stars players
Chattanooga Lookouts players
Sherbrooke Athletics players
United States Navy sailors
United States Navy personnel of World War II